Financial Mail (or the FM, as it is also known), is a South African business publication focused on reaching the country's leading business people. This weekly publication, which was launched in 1959, underwent a major "look and feel" change in 2006, which saw it reclaim its position as the most widely read English business weekly in the country.  The FM also publishes a series of popular corporate profiles as well as annual publications such as The Little Black Book, AdFocus and The Property Handbook.

References

External links
fm.co.za

1959 establishments in South Africa
Business magazines
English-language magazines published in South Africa
Mass media in Johannesburg
Magazines established in 1959
News magazines published in Africa
Pearson plc
Magazines published in South Africa
Weekly magazines published in South Africa